Brisket is a cut of meat from the breast or lower chest of beef or veal. The beef brisket is one of the nine beef primal cuts, though the definition of the cut differs internationally. The brisket muscles include the superficial and deep pectorals. As cattle do not have collar bones, these muscles support about 60% of the body weight of standing or moving cattle. This requires a significant amount of connective tissue, so the resulting meat must be cooked correctly to tenderise it.

According to the Random House Dictionary of the English Language, Second Edition, the term derives from the Middle English brusket which comes from the earlier Old Norse brjósk, meaning cartilage. The cut overlies the sternum, ribs, and connecting costal cartilages.

Method of cooking 

Briskets can be cooked in many ways, including baking, boiling and roasting. Basting of the meat is often done during the cooking. This normally tough cut of meat, due to the collagen fibers that make up the significant connective tissue in the cut, is tenderized when the collagen gelatinises, resulting in a more tender brisket. The fat cap, which is often left attached to the brisket, helps to keep the meat from drying during the prolonged cooking necessary to break down the connective tissue in the meat.  Water is necessary for the conversion of collagen to gelatine, which is the hydrolysis product of collagen.

Popular methods in the United States include rubbing with a spice rub or marinating the meat, and then cooking slowly over indirect heat from charcoal or wood. This is a form of smoking the meat. A hardwood, such as oak, pecan, hickory or mesquite is sometimes added, alone or in combination with other hardwoods, to the main heat source. Sometimes, they make up all of the heat sources, with chefs often prizing characteristics of certain woods. The smoke from the woods and from burnt dripping juices further enhances the flavor. The finished meat is a variety of barbecue. Smoked brisket done this way is popular in Texas barbecue. Once finished, pieces of brisket can be returned to the smoker to make burnt ends. Burnt ends are most popular in Kansas City-style barbecue, where they are traditionally served open-faced on white bread. The traditional New England boiled dinner features brisket as a main-course option. 

In the United States, the whole boneless brisket, based on the Institutional Meat Purchase Specifications (IMPS), as promulgated by the United States Department of Agriculture (USDA), has the meat-cutting classification IMPS 120. The North American Meat Processors Association publishes a photographic version of IMPS called the Meat Buyer's Guide. The brisket muscles are sometimes separated for retail cutting: the lean "first cut" or "flat cut" is the deep pectoral, while the fattier "second cut", "point", "fat end", or "triangular cut" is the superficial pectoral. For food service use, they are IMPS 120A and 120B, respectively.

Other variations
Brisket has a long history in the United States. Brisket is the meat of choice for slow smoking barbecue in Texas, and is often considered the "National Dish of Texas".

In Britain, it is generally not smoked, but is one of a number of low-cost cuts which historically may have been boiled with root vegetables and mild spices, or cooked very slowly in a lidded casserole dish with gravy. The dish, known as a pot roast in the United States, but more commonly as braised or stewed beef in Britain, is often accompanied by root and tuber vegetables; for example, boiled beef and carrots (as mentioned in the song of the same name) is a well-known traditional dish emblematic of working class cockney culture. Good results may also be achieved in a slow cooker. Cooked brisket, being boneless, carves well after refrigeration, and is a versatile, cheaper cut.

In Germany, brisket is braised in dark beer and cooked with celery, carrots, onions, bay leaves and a small bundle of thyme.

In traditional Jewish cooking,  brisket is most often braised as a pot roast, especially as a holiday main course, usually served at Rosh Hashanah, Passover and on the Sabbath. For reasons of economics and kashrut, it was historically one of the more popular cuts of beef among Ashkenazi Jews. Brisket is also the most popular cut for corned beef, which can be further spiced and smoked to make pastrami. The Jewish community in Montreal also makes Montreal-style smoked meat, a close relative of pastrami, from brisket.

In Hong Kong, it is cooked with spices over low heat until tender, and is commonly served with noodles in soup or curry.

In Korean cuisine, traditionally it is first boiled at low temperature with aromatic vegetables, then pressed with a heavy object in a container full of a soy sauce-based marinade. The ensuing preserved meat is served in match-length strips as an accompaniment (banchan) to a meal. This is called jang jorim. Brisket is also the main ingredient in a spicy soup called yuk ke jang, part of the class of soups that are complete meals in Korean cuisine. Nowadays, it is also popular to cook thin slices of it quickly over a hot plate.

In Thai cuisine, it is used to prepare suea rong hai, a popular grilled dish originally from Isan in northeastern  Thailand.

In New Zealand cuisine, it is used in a boil-up. Boiled in seasoned water with green vegetables and potatoes, it is popular amongst Maori people.

It is a common cut of meat used in Vietnamese phở soup.

In Italian cuisine, brisket is used to prepare bollito misto, a typical Northern Italy recipe.

On the Indian subcontinent, it is used in nihari, a popular dish.

In Mexican cuisine, brisket is used to prepare suadero tacos.

See also

 List of steak dishes

References

Further reading

External links 
 
 

Cuts of beef
Barbecue